Adam Alis Setyano (born 19 December 1993) is an Indonesian professional footballer who plays as a midfielder for Liga 1 club Borneo Samarinda and the Indonesia national team.

Club career

Early career
After going through youth training at hometown club Persija Jakarta, Adam Alis failed to win a spot in the senior team of one of Indonesia's most famous clubs and played in the lower leagues until 2015 when he decided to accept an offer to play in Bahrain.

East Riffa
Adam Alis in 2015 played for Bahraini Premier League club East Riffa only for six matches amid his struggle to earn playing time. Despite the challenges, he managed to cut his teeth in Middle East football.

Barito Putera
After returning to Indonesia with international experience, Adam Alis in 2016 found a starting spot at a middling club in the top-tier of Indonesian football, Barito Putera, where he played in 34 matches and scored two goals. This turn of events improved his confidence to continue his footballing career.

Arema F.C.
Adam Alis rose to national prominence as an industrious attacking midfielder after he joined Arema in 2017 and participated in the 2017 Indonesia President's Cup, in which Arema became champion and he earned the title as the best player in the tournament that was a prelude to the 2017 Liga 1 season. The performance earned him a call to the senior national team.

On 15 April 2017, Adam made his league debut for the club in a match against Persib Bandung, playing the full 90 minute in a 0–0 draw. Eight days later, he give assists a opening goal by Dedik Setiawan in Arema's 2–0 win over Bhayangkara. On 18 August, he give two assists in a 3–0 home win over Persiba Balikpapan. On 30 August, he scored his first goal for Arema, as they drew 3–3 against PSM Makassar. On 11 November, he played his last match with Arema in a 2–3 loss to Borneo, Adam coming as a substitutes in the 61st minute for Benny Wahyudi, during with Arema in 2017 season, Adam became one of the players who appeared most often, even though the coach changed to Joko Susilo. This season, Adam appeared in 31 matches and scored one goal.

Sriwijaya F.C.
With his popularity rising, Adam Alis for the 2018 Liga 1 season moved to Sriwijaya that wanted to reclaim its past glory when it was a feared top-flight club. The ambitious project of recruiting high-paid players ended up in disaster when the club hit financial trouble in the middle of the season and failed to pay salaries. A group of players, including Adam Alis, decided to leave the club after months of receiving no payment for their services that propelled the club to the third position in the table after 15 matches.

Bhayangkara
After the Sriwijaya debacle, Adam in July 2018 found a spot in Liga 1 club Bhayangkara, which was based in his hometown of Jakarta. Bhayangkara won the 2017 Liga 1 title a few months before he joined. Adam Alis has played more games at Bhayangkara than any previous club and decided to relocate his family to the Central Java city of Solo after the club opted to move its base there in order to capture more fans than in Jakarta where most football enthusiasts support Persija. On 21 July 2018, Adam made his Bhayangkara debut in a 2–3 win over Bali United at Kapten I Wayan Dipta Stadium. Adam give assists a goal by Herman Dzumafo in Bhayangkara's 2–1 away win over PSIS Semarang on 13 August. Adam give two assists in Bhayangkara's 2–2 draw over PS Barito Putera on 22 September and give antoher two assists in a 2–0 win over Sriwijaya on 12 October. Adam became a regular starter for Bhayangkara under coach Simon McMenemy, and saw an improvement in his performances for the side in the number of matches.

He scored his first goal for the side on 22 September 2019 in a 1–1 draw with Borneo. His form in November saw him score two further goals in win against Persipura Jayapura (1–3), and win against Arema (1–0). Adam, was named player of the month for November 2021. On 4 December, he scored the opening goal  in a 3–0 over Persija Jakarta at PTIK Stadium. On 12 December, Adam scored equalizer in a 2–3 away win over Badak Lampung. He contributed with 27 league appearances and 5 goals during with Bhayangkara for 2019 season and only played 2 times for 2020 season because the league was officially discontinued due to the COVID-19 pandemic.

On 6 November 2021, Adam scored his first league goal of the 2021–22 season, opening the scoring in a 2–0 win over PSM Makassar, with the result, brought Bhayangkara to 1st place league table. On 2 December, he scored a brace for the club in a 2–0 away win against Persipura, with the result, securing Bhayangkara's position at the top of the league table. 

On 14 January 2022, he was involved in Bhayangkara's 2–3 win over Madura United, scoring a goal in the 73rd minute. During with Bhayangkara since 2018, he has scored a total of 9 goals, his slick performance as an attacking midfielder is often Paul Munster's first choice. in the 2021–2022 season, he appeared in 26 matches with a total time of 1.610 minutes and scored 4 goals.

Return to Arema F.C.
On April 5 April 2022, Adam decided to sign a contract with his former club since 2017, Arema. He also brought Arema back to win the Indonesia President's Cup for the third time, for Adam, he has felt the title with Arema twice, after the last time happened in 2017. He made his league debut in a 0–3 lost against Borneo Samarinda on 24 July as a substitute in the 46th minute. Until the first round ended, he appeared in 18 matches, 2 assists and no goals, Adam became the fourth player to leave Arema for the second round. Previous, Hasyim Kipuw decided to Madura United, Irsyad Maulana and Hanis Sagara Putra to Persita Tangerang.

Borneo Samarinda
On 26 January 2023, he signed two-year contract with Liga 1 club Borneo Samarinda. Adam made his club debut four days later, coming on as a substitutes, scored his first league goal in 48th minute second half in a 2–0 win against Persik Kediri, the latter result saw Borneo Samarinda move to 4th position in the league table. On 16 February, Adam scored in a 3–1 home win against Persikabo 1973 at Segiri Stadium. On 3 March, Adam scored the winning goal in a 0–1 away win over Madura United. He added his fourth goals of the season on 12 March with one goal against PSIS Semarang in a 6–1 home win.

International career
Adam Alis made his international debut for the senior team on 8 June 2017 against Cambodia. He scored his first international goal in a 25 May 2021 friendly match in Dubai against Afghanistan.

International goals

Career statistics

Club

International

Honours

Club
Arema
 Indonesia President's Cup: 2017, 2022

Sriwijaya
 East Kalimantan Governor Cup: 2018

Individual
 Indonesia President's Cup Best Player: 2017
 Liga 1 Player of the Month: November 2021

Personal life
Adam Alis is a childhood Inter Milan fan, and said that it would be his dream to one day play for that club.

References

External links 
 
 

1993 births
Living people
Betawi people
Indonesian footballers
Sportspeople from Jakarta
Indonesian expatriate footballers
Expatriate footballers in Bahrain
Perserang Serang players
Dewa United F.C. players
Persija Jakarta players
East Riffa Club players
PS Barito Putera players
Arema F.C. players
Sriwijaya F.C. players
Bhayangkara F.C. players
Liga 1 (Indonesia) players
Bahraini Premier League players
Indonesian Premier Division players
Indonesia youth international footballers
Association football midfielders
Indonesia international footballers